Glossaulax is a genus of large sea snails, marine gastropod mollusks in the family Naticidae, the moon snails.

Species 
 Glossaulax draconis (Dall, 1903)
 Glossaulax epheba (Hedley, 1915)
 Glossaulax petiveriana (Récluz, 1843)
 Glossaulax reclusiana (Deshayes, 1839)
 Glossaulax reiniana (Dunker, 1877)
 † Glossaulax secunda (Rochebrune & Mabille, 1885) 
 Glossaulax vesicalis (Philippi, 1849)
Species brought into synonymy
 Glossaulax aulacoglossa (Pilsbry & Vanatta, 1909): synonym of Neverita aulacoglossa (Pilsbry & Vanatta, 1909)
 Glossaulax bicolor (Philippi, 1849): synonym of Glossaulax petiveriana (Récluz, 1843)
 Glossaulax didyma (Röding, 1798): synonym of Neverita didyma (Röding, 1798)

Feeding habits 
As is true of all naticid genera, species in this genus are carnivorous and predatory.

References

 Kilburn, R. N. (1976). A revision of the Naticidae of Southern Africa and Moçambique (Mollusca). Annals of the Natal Museum. 22: 829-884.
 Torigoe K. & Inaba A. (2011) Revision on the classification of Recent Naticidae. Bulletin of the Nishinomiya Shell Museum 7: 133 + 15 pp., 4 pls.

External links
 Pilsbry, H. A. (1929). Neverita reclusiana (Desh.) and its allies. The Nautilus. 42(4): 109-113, pl. 6

Naticidae